Roqui-ye Pain (also Romanized as Roqū’ī-ye Pā’īn; also known as Roqū’ī) is a village in Baqeran Rural District, in the Central District of Birjand County, South Khorasan Province, Iran. At the 2006 census, its population was 8, in 4 families.

References 

Populated places in Birjand County